Cyrus Reed Teed (October 18, 1839 – December 22, 1908) was a U.S. eclectic physician and alchemist turned pseudoscientific religious leader and self-proclaimed messiah. In 1869, claiming divine inspiration, Teed took on the name Koresh and proposed a new set of scientific and religious ideas which he called Koreshanity, including the belief in the existence of a concave, or "cellular", Hollow Earth cosmology positing that the sky, humanity, and the surface of the Earth exist on the inside of a universe-encompassing sphere.

In New York in the 1870s, he founded the Koreshan Unity, a commune whose rule of conduct was based on his teachings. Other similar communities were established in Chicago and San Francisco. After 1894, the group concentrated itself in the small Florida town of Estero, seeking to build a "New Jerusalem" in that locale, peaking at 250 residents during the first decade of the 20th century. Following Teed's death late in 1908 the group went into decline, finally disappearing in 1961, leaving the Koreshan State Historic Site behind.

Biography

Early years
Cyrus Reed Teed was born October 18, 1839 in Trout Creek, New York to Sarah and Jesse Teed. Cyrus grew up in Utica, New York and, after leaving school at age 11, went to work on the Erie Canal as a driver of the animals that pulled the boats along. Cyrus was a distant relative of Joseph Smith, founder of the Latter Day Saint movement.

Teed studied medicine before opening a medical practice in Utica, New York.

Koreshanity
As a young eclectic physician, Teed was always interested in unconventional experiments, such as alchemy, often involving dangerously high levels of electricity. In the autumn of 1869, during an experiment he was badly shocked, and passed out. During his period of unconsciousness, Teed believed he was visited by a divine spirit who told him that he was the messiah. Inspired, once he awoke Teed vowed to apply his scientific knowledge to "redeem humanity." He promptly changed his first name to "Koresh," the Hebrew version of "Cyrus".

Teed denounced the idea that the Earth revolved around the sun and instead pioneered his own theory of the Universe, known as the Cellular Cosmogony. According to this theory, human beings live on the inside of the planet, not the outside; also, the sun is a giant battery-operated contraption, and the stars mere refractions of its light.

Teed's ideas, called Koreshanity, caught on with others. Koreshanity preached cellular cosmogony, alchemy, reincarnation, immortality, celibacy, communism, and a few other radical ideas. Teed started preaching Koreshanity in the 1870s in New York, forming the Koreshan Unity, later moving to Chicago.

Communal leader

One of Teed's fundamental principles involved the gathering of his most devoted followers into communal living groups. A first commune was formed in Chicago in 1888. By 1902 a second Koreshan community was established in that city. Other followers of the so-called Koreshan Unity formed a short-lived community in San Francisco, which lasted from 1891 to 1892. Small church groups existed in other towns.

In 1894 Teed's followers began to congregate in a small Florida town called Estero, where Teed planned to form a "New Jerusalem." The two Chicago societies, including the group's printing plant, were subsequently shut down and moved to Florida. The colony was extensively landscaped and bedecked with numerous exotic tropical plants. The Koreshans built extensively, establishing a bakery, general store, concrete works, power plant, and "World College of Life" in the community. They also published their newspaper from the site, called The Flaming Sword.

The "golden age" of the Koreshan Unity in Estero was 1903 to 1908, when they had over 250 residents and incorporated the town, its territory embracing some 110 square miles — the fifth largest area of any city in the United States at the time.

They tried to run several candidates for county government against the local Democratic Party, but were never successful.

Death and legacy

On October 13, 1906, while meeting the 1:30PM Atlantic Coast Line train from Baltimore, a group of Koreshans got into a fight in front of R. W. Gillams' grocery store in Ft. Myers, Teed tried to break it up and he was severely beaten by a Marshal Sanchez, suffering injuries from which he never recovered. He died on December 22, 1908.

Teed's followers initially expected his resurrection, after which he and his faithful would be taken up to heaven as he had predicted in his book The Immortal Manhood. They kept a constant vigil over his body for two days, after which time it began to show signs of decay. Following Christmas the county health officer stepped in to order his burial. After his death the group went into decline.

In 1921, a hurricane destroyed his tomb on the southern end of Estero Island and washed his coffin out to sea.

The last remaining follower, Hedwig Michel, deeded the colony to the State of Florida in 1961. It is now the Koreshan State Historic Site.

Cyrus Teed's son, Douglas Arthur Teed, was an American Impressionist painter, but not a follower of his father's teachings.

See also 
 List of messiah claimants
 Messiah complex

Footnotes

Works

 The Immortal Manhood: The Laws and Processes of Its Attainment in the Flesh. Chicago, IL: Guiding Star Publishing House, 1902.
 The Cellular Cosmogony; or, The Earth a Concave Sphere. With Ulysses G. Morrow. Estero, FL: Guiding Star Publishing House, 1905.

Further reading
 Christoph Brumann, "The Dominance of One and Its Perils: Charismatic Leadership and Branch Structures in Utopian Communes," Journal of Anthropological Research, vol. 56, no. 4 (Winter 2000), pp. 425–451.
 Martin Gardner, "Flat and Hollow," in Fads and Fallacies in the Name of Science, 2nd Edition. New York: Dover Publications, 1957; pp. 22–27.
 Donna Kossy, "Dr. Cyrus Teed" in Kooks: A Guide to the Outer Limits of Human Belief. Revised 2nd Edition. Los Angeles: Feral House, 2001.
 James E. Landing, "Cyrus Reed Teed and the Koreshan Unity," in Donald E. Pitzer (ed.), America's Communal Utopias. Chapel Hill, NC: University of North Carolina Press, 2010; pp. 375–395.
 Elliott Mackle, "Cyrus Teed and the Lee County Elections of 1906," Florida Historical Quarterly, vol. 57, no. 1 (July 1978), pp. 1–18.
 Sarah A. Tarlow, "Representing Utopia: The Case of Cyrus Teed's Koreshan Unity Settlement," Historical Archaeology, vol. 40, no. 1 (2006), pp. 89–99.
 Irvin D. S. Winsboro, "The Koreshan Communitarians' Papers and Publications in Estero, 1894–1963," Florida Historical Quarterly, vol. 83, no. 2 (Fall 2004), pp. 173–190.

External links
Koreshan State Historic Site, official web page.
Unofficial Koreshan State Historic Site, unofficial web page.
American Communal Utopias and The Koreshan Unity: A Bibliography Brief overview and great bibliography of works, if slightly dated.
Turning the Universe Inside-Out: Ulysses Grant Morrow's Naples Experiment Examination of the Naples Experiment, and why it failed.
The Startling Testimony of Plumb-Lines Earlier experiments of Ulysses Grant Morrow
Catherine A. Anthony Ohnemus- Dr. Cyrus Teed and the Koreshan Unity Movement
Biography of Cyrus Reed Teed

1839 births
1908 deaths
Hollow Earth proponents
Founders of new religious movements
Pseudohistorians
Self-declared messiahs
Founders of utopian communities
American alchemists
People from Estero, Florida
19th-century alchemists
20th-century alchemists